Leonid Vladimirovich Andreev (born 6 October 1983) is an Uzbekistani pole vaulter and decathlete.

He first competed in the decathlon, placing fourteenth at the 2000 World Junior Championships and winning the gold medal at the 2002 World Junior Championships.

He then concentrated on the pole vault. He was qualified for the 2004 Olympic Games, but did not start in the event. He then no-heighted at the 2005 and 2007 World Championships. At the 2006 Asian Games he won the silver medal.

Starting with 2013, he again focused on the combined events representing his country at the 2016 Summer Olympics where he did not finish the competition.

His personal best in the pole vault is 5.65 metres, achieved in May 2008 in Tashkent.

Competition record

Personal bests

Outdoor
100 metres – 10.97 (+1.8 m/s, Kingston 2002)
400 metres – 49.59 (Incheon 2014)
1500 metres – 4:58.37 (Kingston 2002)
110 metres hurdles – 14.57 (Tashkent 2016)
High jump – 2.10 (Kingston 2002)
Pole vault – 5.70 (Tashkent 2009)
Long jump – 7.30 (Tashkent 2016)
Shot put – 16.27 (Tashkent 2016)
Discus throw – 46.20 (Tashkent 2016)
Javelin throw – 61.02 (Tashkent 2016)
Decathlon – 8250 (Tashkent 2016)

Indoor
60 metres – 7.20 (Doha 2016)
1000 metres – 2:53.84 (Doha 2016)
60 metres hurdles – 8.39 (Doha 2016)
High jump – 1.99 (Hangzhou 2014)
Pole vault – 5.60 (Chemnitz 2009)
Long jump – 7.07 (Hangzhou 2014)
Shot put – 14.83 (Doha 2016)
Heptathlon – 5607 (Doha 2016)

References

1983 births
Living people
Sportspeople from Tashkent
Uzbekistani male pole vaulters
Uzbekistani decathletes
Asian Games silver medalists for Uzbekistan
Asian Games medalists in athletics (track and field)
Athletes (track and field) at the 2002 Asian Games
Athletes (track and field) at the 2006 Asian Games
Athletes (track and field) at the 2010 Asian Games
Athletes (track and field) at the 2014 Asian Games
Athletes (track and field) at the 2008 Summer Olympics
Athletes (track and field) at the 2016 Summer Olympics
Olympic athletes of Uzbekistan
World Athletics Championships athletes for Uzbekistan
Medalists at the 2006 Asian Games
Medalists at the 2010 Asian Games
Medalists at the 2014 Asian Games